American rock band We the Kings has released eight studio albums, one compilation album, five extended plays, and 26 singles. The band's self-titled full-length debut album, released in 2007, included the platinum single "Check Yes Juliet", and went on to sell over 250,000 copies in the US. The group's second album Smile Kid (2009) included Top 40 singles "Heaven Can Wait" and "We'll Be a Dream" (featuring Demi Lovato), as well as the single "She Takes Me High".

The band's third album Sunshine State of Mind was released in 2011 and featured the MTV Video Music Award winner for Most Innovative Music Video of the Year for the group's interactive music video and song "Say You Like Me". Their fourth album Somewhere Somehow was released in late 2013 and includes singles "Just Keep Breathing", "Find You There", "Any Other Way", and "Art of War". Their fifth studio album, Strange Love, came out on November 20, 2015. It featured the single "Runaway".

Albums

Studio albums

Compilation albums

Extended plays

Singles

Other charted songs

Notes

References

Discographies of American artists